Santo Stefano in Manciano is a medieval abbey, long abandoned, at Manciano (frazione of Trevi) in Umbria, Italy. Now only the ruined church, dating at the latest to the first half of the 13th century, remains.

External links
Pro Trevi site

13th-century Roman Catholic church buildings in Italy
Stefano in Manciano
Romanesque architecture in Umbria